The following lists events that happened during 2003 in the Grand Duchy of Luxembourg.

Incumbents

Events

January – March
 13 February – Albert Rodesch is appointed to the Council of State, replacing John Castegnaro, who resigned in January.
 11 March – President of the Council of State Marcel Sauber resigns to take up the vacancy left in the Chamber of Deputies by the death of Willy Bourg on 21 February.

April – June
 29 April – Lydie Polfer meets with the foreign ministers of Belgium, France, and Germany, who agree a framework for the introduction of the planned Common Foreign and Security Policy.
 29 April – Pierre Mores is appointed President of the Council of State, replacing Marcel Sauber.
 20 May – Jean-Claude Juncker delivers his ninth State of the Nation address.
 28 May – Ady Jung is appointed to the Council of State, replacing Marcel Sauber, who resigned in March.
 31 May – CS Grevenmacher win the Luxembourg Cup, beating FC Etzella Ettelbruck 1–0 in the final.
 1 June – Thomas Voeckler wins the 2003 Tour de Luxembourg, with Quick-Step–Davitamon picking up the team title.
 7 June – SES Americom launches its AMC-9 satellite: its first under SES ownership.

July – September
 24 July – The eastern half of the A13 motorway (the collectrice du Sud), part of E29, is opened between Hellange and Schengen, including a 600-metre viaduct across the border to meet Germany's A8.
 9 August – The 2003–04 season of the National Division kicks off.
 12 August – The University of Luxembourg is founded.
 22 August – Plans to extend France's LGV Est to Luxembourg City are formally approved by Luxembourg.
 29 August – Skype is released.

October – December
 10 October – The Luxembourgian Film Prizes are launched.  The prize for Best Film is shared between J'ai toujours voulu etre une Sainte and L'homme au cigare.
 13 October – Lydie Polfer, Dominique de Villepin, and Joschka Fischer inaugurate the Pierre Werner Institute in Luxembourg City.
 November – Edward Steichen's The Family of Man exhibition, at Clervaux, is added to UNESCO's 'Memory of the World' register.
 11 December – Kim Kirchen is named Luxembourg's Sportsperson of the Year.

Deaths
 12 February – Ernest Arendt, Councillor of State
 21 February – Willy Bourg, politician
 1 April – Marcel Ernzer, cyclist
 23 November – Johny Lahure, politician

References

 
Years of the 21st century in Luxembourg
2000s in Luxembourg
Luxembourg
Luxembourg